Sylvio may refer to:

Sylvio Breleur (born 1978), French Guiana football player
Sylvio de Lellis (born 1923), the second son of the Baron Admiral Armando de Lellis
Sylvio Hoffmann Mazzi (born 1908), former Brazilian football player
Sylvio Lazzari (1857–1944), French composer of Austrian origin
Sylvio Mantha (1902–1974), Canadian professional ice hockey player
Sylvio Pirillo (or Silvio Pirilo) (1916–1991), Brazilian football striker
Sylvio Tabet (born in Beirut, Lebanon) is a Lebanese filmmaker and Producer

See also
Stade Sylvio Cator, multi-purpose stadium in Port-au-Prince, Haiti